Mansukhbhai Dhanjibhai Vasava (born 1 June 1957) is an Indian politician associated with Bharatiya Janata Party and former Union Minister of State for Tribal Affairs (till July 5, 2016) in the Government of India under the Prime Ministership of Narendra Modi. He is a senior leader of the bharatiya janata party. He first got elected to 12th Lok Sabha in a by-election held on 25 November 1998 from the Bharuch Parliamentary Constituency of Gujarat, once a stronghold of Congress President Sonia Gandhi's political advisor Ahmed Patel. He was re-elected to the Lok Sabha in 1998, 1999, 2004, 2009 and 2014 from the same constituency (renamed as Bharuch in 2008); five times in a row. He also served in the Government of Gujarat in 1994 as a Deputy Minister. He holds a master's degree in Social Work (M.S.W.) from Gujarat Vidyapith, Ahemadabad and was graduated (B.A.) from
South Gujarat University.

Political career 
He served as Minister of State from May 2014 to 5 July 2016.

1994-96         Member, Gujarat Legislative Assembly

                     Deputy Minister, Government of Gujarat

1998              Elected to 12th Lok Sabha

1998-99         Member, Committee on Members of Parliament Local Area Development Scheme

                     Member, Consultative Committee, Ministry of Social Justice and Empowerment

1999              Re-elected to 13th Lok Sabha (2nd term)

1999-2000     Member, Committee on Labour and Welfare

                     Member, Committee on Private Members` Bills and Resolutions

                     Member, Consultative Committee, Ministry of Rural Development

2004             Re-elected to 14th Lok Sabha( 3rd term)

                    Member, Committee on Chemicals and Fertilizers

                    Member, Committee on Petitions

5 Aug. 2007 Member, Committee on Chemicals & Fertilizers

2009             Re-elected to 15th Lok Sabha (4th term)

31 Aug. 2009     Member, Committee on Science & Technology, Environment & Forests

Address 
Permanent Address:

Rajendra Nagar Society,

Jalaram Road

At & Po. Rajpipla

Ta. Nandod

Distt. Narmada

Gujarat

Tel. (02640) 224300

Delhi Address

55, North Avenue,

New Delhi - 110 001

Tels. (011) 23093670

(M) 9868180050, 9427110866

Notes

External links
 Detailed profile: Mansukhbhai D. Vasava in india.gov.in website

1957 births
Living people
People from Gujarat
India MPs 1998–1999
India MPs 1999–2004
India MPs 2004–2009
India MPs 2009–2014
India MPs 2014–2019
Lok Sabha members from Gujarat
People from Bharuch
Narendra Modi ministry
Bharatiya Janata Party politicians from Gujarat
India MPs 2019–present